Lachnophorini is a tribe of ground beetles in the family Carabidae. There are about 18 genera and more than 190 described species in Lachnophorini.

Genera
These 18 genera belong to the tribe Lachnophorini:

 Amphithasus Bates, 1871
 Anchonoderus Reiche, 1843
 Aporesthus Bates, 1871
 Asklepia Liebke, 1938
 Balligratus Moret & Ortuño, 2017
 Calophaena Klug, 1821
 Calophaenoidea Liebke, 1930
 Calybe Laporte, 1834
 Ega Laporte, 1834
 Eucaerus LeConte, 1853
 Euphorticus G.Horn, 1881
 Grundmannius Basilewsky, 1965
 Guatemalteca Erwin, 2004
 Lachnaces Bates, 1872
 Lachnophorus Dejean, 1831
 Peruphorticus Erwin & Zamorano, 2014
 Pseudophorticus Erwin, 2004
 Selina Motschulsky, 1858

References

External links

 

Lebiinae
Beetle tribes